American Islamic College (AIC) is a private Islamic university in Chicago, Illinois. It accepts students from all backgrounds and prepares students for leadership and policy making roles in American society; and for management and staff of American Muslim institutions, and; serving as a resource to American institutions and individuals for learning about Islam. In 2017, it enrolled fewer than 50 students and offered bachelor's and master's degrees in Islamic Studies and master's of Islamic Jurisprudence.

History
AIC was founded in the early 1980s by a coalition of American Muslim leaders in cooperation with colleagues in the Middle East. It received support from the Organization of Islamic Cooperation and the Islamic Development Bank.

References

External links

Islamic universities and colleges in the United States
Islamic schools in Illinois
Seminaries and theological colleges in Illinois
1983 establishments in Illinois
Educational institutions established in 1983
Universities and colleges in Chicago